Raúl Hernán Villalba (born 9 February 1989), is a Paraguayan professional footballer who plays for Club Agropecuario Argentino as a midfielder.

Career

Villalba has played with Newell's Old Boys for his entire football career. Despite being born and raised in Argentina,  Villalba was called up and debuted for the Paraguay national football team in a 1–0 loss against Peru, in October 2015. He was eligible to represent Paraguay through his parents, who are of Paraguayan descent.

Honours 
Newell's Old Boys
Argentine Primera División 2012–13

References

1989 births
Living people
Footballers from Rosario, Santa Fe
Citizens of Paraguay through descent
Paraguayan footballers
Paraguay international footballers
Argentine footballers
Argentine sportspeople of Paraguayan descent
Paraguayan Primera División players
Newell's Old Boys footballers
Association football midfielders